Bilal Maarbani (12 February 1998) is a Lebanon international rugby league footballer who plays as a  or er for the Blacktown Workers Sea Eagles in the NSW Cup.

He was selected to represent the Lebanon in the 2017 Rugby League World Cup and at the 2019 Rugby League World Cup 9s.

Early career and personal life
Born in Sydney, Australia, Maarbani is of Lebanese descent through his father Omar, who was born in 1973 in Tripoli, Lebanon. He played his junior rugby league for Bankstown Sports, and attended Bass Hill High School. He is an apprentice electrician.

Playing career
Maarbani originally signed with the Canterbury-Bankstown Bulldogs, but moved to the Manly-Warringah Sea Eagles at the start of the 2017 season. He played in Manly's 2017 Under 20s grand final win 20-16 against Parramatta Eels, scoring a try before half time.

He was selected to represent the Lebanon in the 2017 Rugby League World Cup.

References

External links
Sea Eagles profile
2017 RLWC profile

1998 births
Living people
Australian electricians
Australian people of Lebanese descent
Australian rugby league players
Blacktown Workers players
Lebanon national rugby league team players
Rugby league centres
Rugby league fullbacks
Rugby league players from Sydney
Rugby league wingers